Gastrodynerus is a small south-western nearctic genus of potter wasps with four currently recognized species, all of them found in Mexico. Gastrodynerus vanduzeei is also found in the United States.

References

 Bohart, R.M. 1984. Gastrodynerus, a new genus of Eumenidae from Western North America (Hymenoptera: Eumenidae) The Pan-Pacific Entomologist 60: 12–15.

Biological pest control wasps
Potter wasps
Hymenoptera genera